The Imam Ali Mosque, is a large Shia Muslim mosque in the country located in Järfälla Municipality, Stockholm County, Sweden.

In May 2017, there was an arson attack against the building, a fire caused major damage to the facade and roof of a mosque. The attacker is believed to be an ISIS sympathiser or a far-right activist.

References

External links

Official website

Attacks on Shiite mosques
Anti-Muslim violence in Europe
Arson in Sweden
Mosques in Stockholm
Shia mosques in Sweden